Antifest was a punk rock festival taking place in Svojšice in the Czech Republic.

History
Antifest was organised in the middle of summer, and the first one took place in 1995. In the beginning the full title was Anti-society Fest, but later Antifest came in common use. Beside punk rock bands a significant number of ska, psychobilly and rockabilly bands appeared during the fest.

Major European bands were appearing during the festival, performing on two stages. Visitors also came from different parts of Europe, mainly from the Czech Republic, Germany and Poland.

2005 edition (11th) was the first one to last for three days, previously the festival took two days. This event was organised by Agency 92. The last edition took place in 2007. An unofficial edition (Tribute to Antifest) took place in 2020.

Bands performing at Antifest

11th edition (05-07/08/2005)
Peter and the Test Tube Babies (UK), 999 (UK), One Way System (UK), The Vibrators (UK), Goldblade, Guitar Gangsters (UK), Skarface (FR), Polemic, Resistance 77, The Lurkers, Deadline, TV Smith!, Sick 56 (UK), Distortion (UK), The Analogs (PL), Bulbulators (PL), Holly B (D), Green Monster, Bad Preachers (B), Damn Luckies (B), Skampararas (PL), Konflikt (SK), Zóna A (SK), E!E, N.V.Ú. (CZ), SPS (CZ), Tleskač (CZ), Chcancers, Gauneři, Znouzecnost, Slobodná Európa (SK), Argies (ARG), Komety (PL), Ex Tip, Totální Nasazení (CZ), 100 Zvířat (CZ), Insania, Illegality, The Mordor's Crazyhorser Gang, Tony Ducháček & Garage, VT Marvin, Hardy z Těla, Benjaming Band, Vertigo, Rock n' Roll Gang, Kohout Plaší Smrt, Lord Alex, Flaming Cocks, Partyzáni, Heebie Jeebies, Mad Pigs, Juares, V.A.S.

See also

List of punk rock festivals
List of historic rock festivals

References

External links
Festival's official website
Agency 92 official website

Punk rock festivals
Rock festivals in the Czech Republic
Music festivals established in 1995
Summer events in the Czech Republic